Kaliko may refer to:

The Keliko people of East Africa
Euphorbia heterophylla, the kaliko plant
Kaliko (Oz), a character in the Oz books
Kaliko, an edge-matching puzzle game played using serpentiles
Kaliko Kauahi, American actress

See also
Calico (disambiguation)